Cambridge University Combined Boat Clubs (CUCBC) is responsible for the day-to-day running of college rowing in Cambridge. It is also responsible for organising May and Lent bumps which are the main races of the Easter and Lent terms respectively.

Foundation of the CUCBC

Historically, only men's rowing existed at Cambridge University, and all of the races and river rules were controlled by the Cambridge University Boat Club (CUBC). Newnham College Boat Club was the only rowing club for women from its founding in 1893 until Cambridge University Women's Boat Club (CUWBC) was founded in 1941. Separate women's races began in the 1970s, controlled by the Cambridge University Women's Boat Club. The two organising bodies had differing rules of the river and arrangements for racing, leading to many potential problems. Initially, the number of women racing was small, but it soon grew to a similar number as that of the men. A vote was held on passing control for the women's racing to the CUBC in the 1980s, thereby bringing all control to a single entity, but this proposal was rejected by members of the CUBC. By the mid-1990s, the CUCBC was founded to oversee all river regulations, for rowers of both sexes, on the River Cam and to control the bumps races and various other events. This also had the effect that the CUBC and CUWBC were then free to concentrate on The Boat Race and Henley Boat Races respectively.

CUCBC Exec Committee
The CUCBC Committee for 2013-14 consists of:

There also exists a Senior Committee with responsibility for strategic and longer-term issues affecting University and College rowing on the Cam.

CUCBC Run Events 
CUCBC runs four main events during the course of the academic year:

 University IVs (Michaelmas Term)
 Lent Bumps (6th/7th Week, Lent Term)
 Small Boats Regatta (0th Week, Easter Term)
 May Bumps (7th-8th Week, Easter Term)

Clubs

References

External links 

 CUCBC website

 
Rowing clubs in England
Sports clubs established in the 1990s